Palyul Monastery, also known as Palyul Namgyal Jangchub Choling Monastery and sometimes romanized as Pelyul Monastery, is one of the "Six Mother Monasteries" of the Nyingma tradition of Tibetan Buddhism. It was founded in 1665 by Rigzin Kunzang Sherab in Pelyul in Baiyü County, Garzê Tibetan Autonomous Prefecture in China's Sichuan province, on the eastern edge of Tibet in Kham. The monastery is the seat of the Nam Chö Terma of Terton Migyur Dorje. Drubwang Padma Norbu (Penor Rinpoche) was the 11th throneholder of the Palyul lineage.  Upon his mahaparinirvana in March, 2009, Karma Kuchen Rinpoche became the 12th throneholder.

Namdroling Monastery in Bylakuppe, India, is where the current throneholder to the Palyul lineage has resided since exile from Tibet during Chinese annexation.

Dzogchen Lineage of Palyul
 Chöku Kuntuzangpo (Dharmakaya Samantabhadra)
 Drugpa Dorjé Changchen (Vajradhara)
 Dorje Sempa (Vajrasattva)
 Thugjé Chenpo Chenrezig (Avalokitesvara)
 Acarya Garab Dorje (Prahevajra)
 Jampal Shenyen (Manjushrimitra)
 Acarya Shiri Sing-ha
 Yeshe Do (Jnanasutra)
 Padma Jyungnas (Padmasambhava)
 Gelong Namkhai Nyingpo
 Khandro Yeshe Tsogyal
 Nanam Dorjé Dudzom
 Lhase Mutri Tsanpo
 Tertön Zangpo Dragpa
 Trulku Rigzin Chenpo
 Kunpang Dönyöd Gyaltsan
 Gyudzin Sönam Chogzang
 Drubthob Thangthong Gyalpo
 Jangsem Kunga Nyima
 Trulzhig Trayaketu
 Tsenchen Trayavajra
 Chöjé Bodhi Sing-ha
 Trulku Tashi Gyamtso
 Drubwang Tonpa Sengge
 Trulku Chönyi Gyamtso
 Terton Migyur Dorje
 Khaschog Karma Chagme

Throneholders
 Rigzin Kunzang Sherab (rig 'dzin kun bzang shes rab, 1636–1398). He built "a temple with a reliquary stupa inside to preserve Mingyur Dorje’s relics, and had a statue of him made."
 Padma Lhundrub Gyatso
 1st Drubwang Padma Norbu
 Karma Tashi
 Karma Lhawang and Karma Dondam
 Gyurme Nyedon Tanzin
 Padma Do-ngag Tanzin
 Do-ngag Chökyi Nyima
 2nd Drubwang Padma Norbu (Padma Kunzang Tanzin Norbu, also known as Rig'dzin dpal chen 'dus pa)
 Karma Thegchog Nyingpo
 3rd Drubwang Padma Norbu Rinpoche (Jigme Thubten Shedrub Chokyi Drayang Palzangpo, Wylie: 'jigs med thub bstan bshad sgrub chos kyi sgra dbyangs dpal bzang po)
 Karma Kuchen (Thubtan Tshultrim Norbu Odsal Thrinlas Kunkhyab Palzangpo)
 Drubwang Migyur Dechen Garwang Zilnon Dorje Palzangpo

Other people 
 Jampal Dorje (19th and 20th centuries)

Notes

References
Namchö Ngondro, The Great Perfection Buddha in the Palm of the Hand. Gyaltrul Rinpoche, Yeshe Nyingpo, Ashland, Oregon, (c)1986
Ven. Tsering Lama Jampal Zangpo, A Garland of Immortal Wish-fulfilling Trees: The Palyul Tradition of the Nyingmapa. Snow Lion, (c)1988
 Dorji Wangchuk (Universität Hamburg): Das dPal-yul-KIoster in Geschichte und Gegenwart: Die Wiederbelebung einer klösterlichen Tradition der rNying-ma-Schule (PDF-Datei; 1,8 MB)

External links
 

Buddhist monasteries in Sichuan
Tibetan Buddhist temples in the Garzê Tibetan Autonomous Prefecture
Nyingma monasteries and temples